The Philistine language is the extinct language of the Philistines. Very little is known about the language, of which a handful of words survived as cultural loanwords in Biblical Hebrew, describing specifically Philistine institutions, like the seranim, the "lords" of the Philistine five cities ("Pentapolis"), or the ’argáz receptacle, which occurs in 1 Samuel 6 and nowhere else, or the title padî.

Classification
To judge from inscriptions alone, it could appear that the Philistine language is simply part of the local Canaanite dialect continuum which includes Hebrew, Edomite,  Moabite, Ekronite and Phoenician. For instance, the Ekron inscription, identifying the archaeological site securely as the Biblical Ekron, is the first connected body of text to be identified as Philistine, on the basis of its location. However, it is written in a Canaanite dialect similar to Phoenician and Hebrew.

There is not enough information about the language of the Philistines to relate it confidently to any other languages. Possible relations to Indo-European languages, even Mycenaean Greek, support the theory that immigrant Philistines originated among "sea peoples". There are hints of non-Semitic vocabulary and onomastics, but the inscriptions, not clarified by some modern forgeries,<ref>Joseph Naveh, "Some Recently Forged Inscriptions," Bulletin of the American Schools of Oriental Research" (Summer 1982:53–58).</ref> are enigmatic: a number of inscribed miniature "anchor seals" have been found at various Philistine sites. On the other hand, evidence from the slender corpus of brief inscriptions from Iron Age IIA-IIB Tell es-Safi (Tell es-Safi inscription) demonstrates that at some stage during the local Iron Age, the Philistines started using one of the dialects (either Phoenician or Hebrew) of the local Canaanite language and script, which in time masked and replaced the earlier, non-local linguistic traditions, which doubtless became reduced to a linguistic substratum, for it ceased to be recorded in inscriptions. Towards the end of the Philistine settlement in the area, in the 8th and the 7th centuries BC before their destruction by Assyria, the primary written language in Philistia was a Canaanite dialect that was written in a version of the West Semitic alphabet so distinctive that Frank Moore Cross termed it the "Neo-Philistine script". The Assyrian and Babylonian conquests destroyed the Philistine presence on the coast. When documentation resumes, under the Achaemenid Empire (Persian Empire), it is in the Aramaic language, the  lingua franca of the Assyria, Babylonian and Achaemenid empires.

Philistine as an Indo-European language

There is some evidence in favour of the suggestion that the Philistines did originally speak some Indo-European language, which would help explain the markedly Aegean Greek origin of Philistine pottery styles and decorative motifs, particularly Philistine Bichrome ware, which differ markedly from the local Semitic artistic styles. A number of Philistine-related words found in the Hebrew Bible are not local Semitic, and can in some cases, with reservations, be traced back to Proto-Indo-European roots. R.D. Barnett related the Philistine word for captain, seren, to the Greek word tyrannos (which may be related to the Neo-Hittite sarawanas/tarawanas)Helck W., Ein sprachliches Indiz für die Herkunft der Philister, in: Beiträge zur Namenforschung 21, 1983, p. 31.Chantraine, P. Dictionnaire étymologique de la langue grecque. Histoire des mots, vol. 4.1, 1968, p. 1146.Cornil, P. "Une étymologie étrusco-hittite", Atti del II Congresso Internazionale de Hittitologia, Pavía, 1995, p. 84-85. and Edward Sapir made a case for relating kōbá`/qōbá` ("helmet", used of Goliath's copper helmet in ) to Hittite kupahis. Both these words have been adopted into Hebrew. Some Philistine names, such as Goliath, Achish, and Phicol, appear to be non-Semitic in origin, and Indo-European etymologies have been suggested. Recently, an inscription dating to the late 10th/early 9th centuries BC with two names, very similar to one of the suggested etymologies of the popular Philistine name Goliath (compare Lydian Alyattes, Greek Kalliades, Carian Wljat'') was found in the excavations at Tell es-Safi/Gath.

Notes

External links
The Canaanite Dialect of the Dedicatory Royal Inscription from Ekron, 2004 – A summary of articles about the Ekron inscription.

Philistines
Philistine language
Unclassified languages of Asia
Extinct languages of Asia
Languages extinct in the 9th century BC